The huge moth family Noctuidae contains the following genera:

A B C D E F G H I J K L M N O P Q R S T U V W X Y Z

Tabomeeres
Tachosa
Tadaxa
Taenerema
Taeniopyga
Taeniosea
Tafalla
Taivaleria
Talapa
Talapoptera
Talariga
Talmela
Tamba
Tamila
Tamseale
Tamseuxoa
Tamsia
Tamsola
Tandilia
Tanocryx
Tantura
Taphonia
Tarache
Tarachephia
Tarachidia
Taraconica
Taramina
Targalla
Targallodes
Tarista
Tarsicopia
Taseopteryx
Tathodelta
Tathorhynchus
Tatorinia
Tautobriga
Taveta
Tavia
Tavila
Taviodes
Technemon
Tectorea
Tegarpagon
Tegiapa
Tegteza
Teinoletis
Teinoptera
Telmia
Telorta
Temnoptera
Tendarba
Tephrialia
Tephrias
Tephrinops
Tephriopis
Tephrochares
Teratocera
Teratoglaea
Tesagrotis
Tesomonoda
Tetanolita
Tetracme
Tetrapyra
Tetrapyrgia
Tetrargentia
Tetrastictypena
Tetrisia
Teucocranon
Thalatha
Thalathoides
Thalatta
Thalerastria
Thalomicra
Thalpophila
Thargelia
Thaumasiodes
Thausgea
Thecamichtis
Thegalea
Thelidora
Thelxinoa
Themma
Theotinus
Therasea
Thermesia
Thermosara
Thiachroia
Thiacidas
Thiochroa
Thiona
Thioptera
Tholera
Tholeropsis
Tholocoleus
Tholomiges
Thopelia
Thoracolopha
Thoracolophotos
Thria
Throana
Thurberiphaga
Thurnerichola
Thursania
Thyas
Thyatirina
Thyatirodes
Thyreion
Thyrestra
Thyria
Thyridospila
Thyriodes
Thyrostipa
Thysania
Thysanoplusia
Tibiocillaria
Tibracana
Tigrana
Tigreana
Tiliacea
Timora
Tineocephala
Tinnodoa
Tinolius
Tipasa
Tipasodes
Tipra
Tiracola
Tiridata
Tiruvaca
Tisagronia
Tmetolophota
Toana
Toanodes
Toanopsis
Tochara
Tolnaodes
Toanopsis
Tolnosphingia
Tolpia
Tolpiodes
Tornacontia
Tornosinus
Tosacantha
Toxocampa
Toxonprucha
Toxophleps
Trachea
Tracheoides
Tracheplexia
Trachodopalpus
Trachysmatis
Tracta
Tranoses
Transbryoleuca
Transeuplexia
Translatix
Transsimyra
Trapezoptera
Trauaxa
Treitschkendia
Triaena
Trichagrotis
Trichanarta
Trichanua
Trichestra
Tricheurois
Trichobathra
Trichoblemma
Trichocerapoda
Trichoclea
Trichocosmia
Trichofeltia
Trichogatha
Tricholita
Tricholonche
Trichopalpina
Trichophotia
Trichoplexia
Trichoplusia
Trichopolia
Trichopolydesma
Trichoptya
Trichordestra
Trichorhiza
Trichoridia
Trichorthosia
Trichosellus
Trichosilia
Trichospolas
Trichotarache
Trichypena
Tricopis
Tricraterifrontia
Tridentifrons
Tridepia
Trigeminostola
Trigonephra
Trigonistis
Trigonochrostia
Trigonodes
Trigonodesma
Trigonophora
Trilophia
Trilophonota
Tringilburra
Triocnemis
Triommatodes
Triphaenopsis
Tripseuxoa
Tripudia
Trisateles
Trispila
Trissernis
Trissophaes
Tristyla
Trisula
Trisulana
Trisulopsis
Tritomoceras
Troctoptera
Trogacontia
Trogatha
Trogoblemma
Trogocraspis
Trogogonia
Trogotorna
Tropidtamba
Trothisa
Trotosema
Trudestra
Trumuspis
Tschetwerikovia
Tuerta
Tuertella
Tumidifrontia
Tunocaria
Tunza
Turacina
Turanica
Turbula
Tycomarptes
Tycracona
Tympanobasis
Tyrissa
Tyta
Tytroca

References 

 Natural History Museum Lepidoptera genus database

 
Noctuid genera T